Brighton Township (T7N R9W) is located in Macoupin County, Illinois, United States. As of the 2010 census, its population was 4,039 and it contained 1,646 housing units.

Geography

Demographics

Adjacent townships
 Shipman Township (north)
 Hillyard Township (northeast)
 Bunker Hill Township (east)
 Omphghent Township, Madison County (southeast)
 Foster Township, Madison County (south)
 Piasa Township, Jersey County (west)
 Fidelity Township, Jersey County (northwest)

References

External links
City-data.com
Illinois State Archives

Townships in Macoupin County, Illinois
Townships in Illinois